The Silencer is a 2000 action film directed by Robert Lee and starring Michael Dudikoff as a professional assassin hired to train a young man who may not be all he seems.

External links
 Review at Apollo Guide
 

2000 action films
2000 films
2000s English-language films
1990s English-language films